Peter Klouda is a Slovak professional ice hockey player who played with HK Poprad in the Slovak Extraliga.

References

Living people
HC Slovan Bratislava players
HK Poprad players
Slovak ice hockey centres
1978 births
Sportspeople from Poprad
Slovak expatriate ice hockey players in Canada
Slovak expatriate ice hockey players in Sweden
Slovak expatriate ice hockey players in the Czech Republic
Expatriate ice hockey players in Romania
Expatriate ice hockey players in Italy
Slovak expatriate sportspeople in Italy
Slovak expatriate sportspeople in Romania